Bullshead is a locality in Alberta, Canada.

Bullshead was so named on account of a nearby hill which had the form of a buffalo's head.

References 

Localities in Cypress County